Nnamdi Asomugha  (born July 6, 1981) is an American actor, producer and former football cornerback. He played college football for the University of California, Berkeley, and was drafted in the first round of the 2003 NFL Draft by the Oakland Raiders. He also played for the Philadelphia Eagles and San Francisco 49ers. For some years, he was considered one of the best shutdown corners in the NFL. In his 11-year career, he was voted All-Pro four times, including two times to the first-team. Asomugha was selected as a member of Fox Sports's NFL All-Decade Team 2000-2009 and USA Today's NFL All-Decade Team 2000s, and is considered one of the greatest Oakland Raiders of all time.

Asomugha received critical acclaim for his portrayal of Carl King in the film Crown Heights (2017). He was nominated for an Independent Spirit Award for Best Supporting Male and he was nominated for an NAACP Image Award for Outstanding Supporting Actor in a Motion Picture. Variety named him one of the seven breakout performers of 2017.

Early life
Nnamdi Asomugha was born in Lafayette, Louisiana, to Nigerian Igbo parents. He was raised in Los Angeles, California. He attended Leuzinger High School in Lawndale, California, and Bishop Montgomery High School in Torrance, California, before transferring to and from Narbonne High School in Harbor City, California, playing high school basketball and football.

College career
Asomugha attended the University of California, Berkeley, where he played for the California Golden Bears football team. He finished his career with 187 tackles, three sacks, 19 stops for losses, eight interceptions, three touchdowns, 15 pass deflections, two fumble recoveries and a forced fumble in 41 games as a free safety. Asomugha graduated with a Bachelor of Science in Business Administration.

Professional career

2003 NFL Combine

Oakland Raiders
Asomugha was the second Cal player to be drafted in the first round (31st overall) of the 2003 NFL draft by the Oakland Raiders. He was moved to cornerback but played sparingly the first two seasons of his career. He became a starter in 2005 and set new highs in tackles with 60 tackles (55 solo) and passes broken up with 14.

In 2006, he recorded his first two career interceptions against the Cleveland Browns. He got his third interception four weeks later against the Pittsburgh Steelers and returned it 24 yards for the first touchdown of his career. Though the team suffered through a 2–14 season, Asomugha's 2006 campaign was his finest yet as he finished the season with 50 tackles (48 solo), eight interceptions, a sack, a forced fumble and one touchdown.  His interception total tied him for second highest total in the National Football League along with four other players (including former Oakland Raiders cornerback Charles Woodson). After the season, Asomugha was invited to the Pro Bowl as an alternate but because of late notice he was not able to attend the annual all-star game. He also received the Oakland Raiders "Commitment to Excellence" Award and was named the team's Most Valuable Player. In addition, Asomugha was selected to Dr. Z Sports Illustrated 2006 All-Pro team as well as The Associated Press 2006 All-Pro Team.
 
Asomugha was selected as the Raiders Team Captain for the 2007 season. Opposing quarterbacks tested him only 31 times with a mere 10 completions the entire season. One NFL scout told Pro Football Weekly that Asomugha was thrown at "less than any defender in the last ten years" in 2007. He finished the 2007 season with 34 tackles(32 solo), 1 interception and 7 breakups and was named a 2008 Pro Bowl alternate.

A free agent in the 2008 offseason, the Raiders placed the exclusive franchise tag on Asomugha on February 20, 2008.

Asomugha was again selected a team captain before the 2008 season. Opposing quarterbacks tested him only 27 times the entire season resulting in just 8 completions. Only perennial all-pros Randy Moss (3 receptions, 40 yards) and Tony Gonzalez (2 receptions, 34 yards) would catch more than one ball on him during the year. New England Patriots head coach Bill Belichick said Asomugha is "as complete a cornerback as he has seen all year". He finished the 2008 season with 40 tackles, 1 interception, 1 forced fumble, and 9 pass deflections. He received the Oakland Raiders "Commitment to Excellence" Award for the second time and was named the team's 2008 Co-Most Valuable Player along with running back Justin Fargas. Asomugha was selected as a starter for the 2009 Pro Bowl. He was selected onto The Sporting News 2008 All-Pro Team as well as the Pro Football Writers Association All-NFL Team for 2008.  Asomugha was also selected onto Peter King's Sports Illustrated 2008 All-Pro team as well as The Associated Press 2008 All-Pro Team.

On February 19, 2009, the Raiders re-signed Asomugha to a complex three-year deal that made him the highest-paid defensive back in NFL history. The first two years, worth $28.5 million, were fully guaranteed. In the third year of the contract, if Oakland wanted to keep Asomugha, it had to pay him the average of the top five highest-paid cornerbacks or $16.875 million, whichever was higher. If the Raiders failed to pick up the option, Asomugha became a free agent with Oakland not having the ability to tag him again.

In August 2009 the Oakland Tribune named Asomugha one of the greatest Oakland Raiders of all time.

A team captain again in 2009 and the NFL's least targeted cornerback by an extremely wide margin, Asomugha was challenged by opposing quarterbacks only 27 times and allowed 13 completions the entire season. After his performance against the Houston Texans, head coach Gary Kubiak said "Asomugha is the best (corner) I've seen in a while throughout this league. He's big, he's fast, they put him out there on an island the whole game. He's an exceptional player." Similar to the past three seasons, Asomugha finished the 2009 season with 34 tackles, 1 interception, and was second in the league with 8 tackles for loss from the cornerback position. Cleveland Browns defensive coordinator Rob Ryan said "The guy is truly unbelievable. He made himself the best corner in football by his work ethic, the way he studies tape, and he's so smart."

Following the 2009 season, Asomugha was selected as a starter for the 2010 Pro Bowl. Asomugha was selected onto The Sporting News 2009 All-Pro Team (2nd team) as well as The Associated Press 2009 All-Pro Team (2nd team). This would mark his third selection to both the Pro Bowl and All-Pro team in his seven-year career with the Oakland Raiders.

In 2010, Asomugha was selected as a member of the Fox Sports's and USA Today's NFL All-Decade Team.

The shutdown corner lived up to his title once again in the 2010 season. While shadowing the opposing teams' top receiver most of the season, Asomugha was still targeted much less than any other cornerback in the NFL. Asomugha allowed just 10 receptions on the 27 passes thrown his way. Most important, Asomugha did not give up a touchdown all year. "He has extraordinary speed – great speed," Seahawks coach Pete Carroll said. "He's exactly what you're looking for in a press corner and about as good as you could hope a guy to be." When facing the Arizona Cardinals, All-Pro wide receiver Larry Fitzgerald said "The thing you see on tape for a man of his size, he has incredible hips and amazingly quick feet, and that's just God given ability to be that tall and be able to move and cut and drive on balls the way he's able to." Following the 2010 season, Asomugha was selected as a starter for the 2011 Pro Bowl. Asomugha was selected onto ESPN John Clayton's 2010 All-Pro Team as well as Peter King's Sports Illustrated 2010 All-Pro team. Asomugha was also selected to the prestigious Associated Press 2010 All-Pro Team, his fourth selection as an All-Pro.

Philadelphia Eagles

Entering the 2011 season, Asomugha was regarded as the top free agent available on the market.  On July 29, 2011, Asomugha agreed to a five-year, $60 million deal, and at least $25 million guaranteed, contract with the Philadelphia Eagles.

In 2011, he finished the season with 40 total tackles, 5 passes defended, and 3 interceptions. Asomugha was named a 2012 Pro Bowl alternate.

During his time in Philadelphia, the team struggled to a 12–20 record, missing the playoffs both years.  Asomugha was eventually released by the team at the end of the 2012 season after he was unable to agree to a restructured deal with the team.

San Francisco 49ers
On April 2, 2013, Asomugha signed a one-year deal with the San Francisco 49ers, under which he would earn a base salary of $1.35 million and with a chance to earn up to an additional $1.65 million in incentives. On November 4, 2013, Asomugha was waived by the team.

Retirement
On December 26, 2013, Asomugha signed a one-day contract with Oakland so he could retire as a Raider. He officially announced his retirement on December 27, 2013.

In 2016, Pro Football Focus named Asomugha the best Oakland Raiders player of the past decade.

Acting

Asomugha made his professional acting debut in 2008 on The CW Network sitcom The Game. In 2009, he played the role of Ken Shaw in the season premiere of Friday Night Lights Season 4. In 2010, he appeared on the TNT drama Leverage as Walle in the Season 3 episode "The Scheherazade Job".

In 2012, he made his on-screen feature film debut in Fire with Fire starring Bruce Willis, Rosario Dawson and Josh Duhamel. He also co-wrote, produced and starred in a dramatic short film titled Double Negative alongside Australian actor Adam J. Yeend, which chronicled 48 hours in the life of a struggling Muslim American writer.

Asomugha has appeared in Will Ferrell's comedy web series Funny or Die, the Roadside Attractions film Hello, My Name Is Doris and as a fictionalized version of himself in the Comedy Central television series Kroll Show, starring Nick Kroll. He also worked as executive producer on the Netflix film Beasts of No Nation.

In 2017, he produced and starred in the Amazon Studios film Crown Heights. Crown Heights premiered in competition in the US Dramatic Category at the Sundance Film Festival on January 23, 2017. The film received favorable reviews out of the Sundance Film Festival, winning the Audience Award for U.S. Dramatic Film.

Asomugha was widely considered one of the breakout actors of the 2017 Sundance Film Festival. More recently he and his iam21 Entertainment company struck a first look deal at Amazon Studios.

Filmography

Film

Television

Awards and nominations

Philanthropy
Asomugha serves as Chairman for the Asomugha Foundation. The Asomugha Foundation operates two primary programs: Orphans and Widows In Need (OWIN) and Asomugha College Tour for Scholars (ACTS).

Through OWIN, Asomugha and his family provide food, shelter, medicine, vocational training, literacy efforts, and scholarships to widows and orphans victimized by poverty or abuse in Nigeria.  Currently, OWIN has two centers in Nigeria and plans to expand to other countries in Africa.

In 2006, Asomugha launched the annual ACTS program. Each year, he teams up with selected students from Bay Area and Los Angeles Area high schools on college tours across the country. One of the organizations he partnered with is the East Oakland Youth Development Center, a 501(c)(3) non-profit organization in Oakland, California. In the first two years, Asomugha took students to visit Morehouse College, Spelman College, Georgia Institute of Technology, Clark Atlanta University, Harvard University, Massachusetts Institute of Technology, Boston University, Brown University and the Berklee College of Music. For the 2009 tour, Asomugha took students to visit schools in New York City including NYU, Columbia University, The Juilliard School, The Fashion Institute of Technology, Fordham University and The New School. In 2010, ACTS expanded to not only service high school students in the Bay Area but also select high schools in the Los Angeles area. For the 2010 tour, ACTS visited schools in Washington D.C. including Georgetown University, George Washington University, American University, Howard University and University of Maryland. In 2011, ACTS traveled to New Orleans, LA.  The campuses visited were Loyola University, Xavier University of Louisiana, Southern University, Tulane University and Louisiana State University. All of the tour participants who have graduated from high school have gone on to attend higher education institutions.

Additionally, Asomugha distributes backpacks to the incoming freshmen each year at Narbonne High School in Los Angeles. He also outfits the football and basketball team with shoes, a mandate he wrote into an endorsement contract he signed with Nike.

Honors

For his commitment to community service, Asomugha was named a Home Depot Neighborhood MVP 2007

In 2008, Asomugha was presented with The President's Volunteer Service Award. An award that was established to recognize the important contributions Americans of all ages are making within their communities through service and civic engagement.

Asomugha has been recognized by fellow members of the NFL Players Association who nominated him in 2005, 2006, 2007, 2008 and 2009 for the Byron "Whizzer" White Award for Outstanding Community Service. In 2010, Asomugha was presented with the 44th annual Byron "Whizzer" White NFL Man of the Year, the NFL Players Association's (NFLPA) highest honor

Asomugha was also nominated for the prestigious Sports Illustrated 2008 Sportsman of the Year award.

In 2009, Asomugha was named to the "Dream Team for Public Service" by the Jefferson Awards for Public Service.

In 2010, Asomugha became the ambassador for United Way of the Bay Area UWBA, dedicated to creating long-lasting change and ensuring all Bay Area residents have access to the building blocks to a better life: education, income and health.

In 2011, Asomugha was named one of three finalists for the Walter Payton Man of the Year Award

In 2012, Asomugha received the inaugural "Role Model of the Year" Award from the Congressionally chartered National Conference on Citizenship

Personal life

On June 24, 2013, Asomugha married actress Kerry Washington. The couple have a daughter, Isabelle, born in 2014, and a son, Caleb, born in 2016.

Asomugha has a form of color-blindness called deuteranomaly and stated in the June 2009 issue of ESPN The Magazine that "It was determined when I was about 7 years old. It's never really affected my play on the field — I can easily distinguish between light and dark colors. I only have trouble between similar colors — the light ones. They look the same to me. No problems on the field."

Asomugha is a member of Kappa Alpha Psi.

Further reading

References

External links

 Asomugha Foundation
 Philadelphia Eagles profile
 Oakland Raiders profile

1981 births
American Conference Pro Bowl players
American football cornerbacks
American people of Igbo descent
American sportspeople of Nigerian descent
California Golden Bears football players
Igbo sportspeople
Living people
Oakland Raiders players
Philadelphia Eagles players
San Francisco 49ers players
Sportspeople from Lafayette, Louisiana
Players of American football from Los Angeles
Haas School of Business alumni